William, Bill, or Billy Benton may refer to:

William Benton (politician) (1900–1973), United States Senator from Connecticut and publisher of the Encyclopædia Britannica
William Benton (writer) (born 1939), American poet and writer
William Benton (cricketer) (1873–1916), English cricketer 
William Duane Benton (born 1950), federal judge from Missouri
William Plummer Benton (1828–1867), general during the American Civil War
Bill Benton (footballer) (1906–1979), Australian rules footballer
Bill W. Benton, American sound engineer
Billy Benton (1895–1967), English footballer

See also
William Benton Clulow (1802–1882), English dissenting minister, tutor and writer